Knowledge Transfer Partnerships (KTP) is a partly government-funded programme to encourage collaboration between businesses and universities in the United Kingdom.

History
KTP was launched in 2003, replacing the Teaching Company Scheme (TCS), which had been formed in 1975.  The programme is funded by some 17 public sector organisations, and led by Innovate UK, an executive non-departmental public body reporting to the Department for Business, Energy & Industrial Strategy.

Structure
Each KTP involves three 'partners':

 a company (this may be a private enterprise, public body or voluntary agency)
 a knowledge base (this may be a university or other higher education institution, research organisation or further education college)
 an associate (a recently qualified graduate)

There are approximately 1,000 concurrent programmes at any one time.

The KTP programme is managed by KTN.

Function
The aims of each KTP programme are to facilitate the transfer of knowledge and technology and the spread of technical and business skills to the company, stimulate and enhance business-relevant research and training undertaken by the knowledge base, and enhance the business and specialist skills of a recently qualified graduate.

As a part-government funded programme, a company entering into a KTP programme contributes between 33 and 50 per cent of the project cost, with the government contributing the remainder.  Average annual project costs are approximately £60,000.  This package includes the associate's salary, as well as a travel budget, personal development budget, academic input and expertise, and administrative support.

Vacancies
Potential KTP associates (recently qualified graduates, generally with a masters or doctoral level qualification) can search and apply for vacancies on the KTP website.  Associates benefit from generous travel and personal development budgets, as well as receiving additional training in business and project management.

References

External links 
 Website

Government agencies established in 2003
Higher education organisations based in the United Kingdom
Knowledge transfer
Organisations based in Swindon
Research and development in the United Kingdom
Science and technology in Wiltshire